Sven Kretschmer (born 31 December 1970 in West Berlin) is a former German footballer.

References

External links 
 

1970 births
Living people
Footballers from Berlin
German footballers
Association football forwards
Bundesliga players
2. Bundesliga players
Tennis Borussia Berlin players
Hertha BSC players
Hertha BSC II players
Eintracht Braunschweig players
Füchse Berlin Reinickendorf players